Heart's Content may refer to:

Heart's Content, Newfoundland and Labrador
Hearts Content National Scenic Area, an old growth forest in Warren County, Pennsylvania
Gunstwerber, a waltz composed by Johann Strauss II
 Heart's Content (album)